Ricky Pearsall is an American football wide receiver for the Florida Gators. He previously played at Arizona State.

Early life and high school
Pearsall grew up in Chandler, Arizona and attended Corona del Sol High School in Tempe, Arizona. As a junior, he set the Arizona High School 6A receiving yard record for a single game with 342 on 14 receptions against Gilbert High School. Pearsall finished the season with 74 receptions for 1,153 yards and 15 touchdowns. Pearsall was rated a three-star recruit and committed to play college football at Arizona State over offers from Air Force, Hawaii, Idaho, New Mexico State, Northern Arizona, and UC Davis.

College career
Pearsall began his college career at Arizona State. He had seven receptions for 128 yards as a freshman. Pearsall played in all four of the Sun Devils' games in the COVID-19 shortened 2020 Pac-12 season and caught six passes for 86 yards and one touchdown. Pearsall had 48 receptions for 580 yards and a team-high four receiving touchdowns as a junior. After the season, he entered the NCAA transfer portal.

Pearsall ultimately transferred to Florida after also considering Oregon. He suffered from a foot injury during training camp, but recovered prior to the start of the season.

Personal life
Pearsall's father, Ricky Pearsall Sr., played college football at Northern Arizona.

References

External links
Arizona State Sun Devils bio
Florida Gators bio

Living people
Players of American football from Arizona
American football wide receivers
Florida Gators football players
Arizona State Sun Devils football players
Year of birth missing (living people)